Lanchester Bay is a bay  wide lying east of Havilland Point, along the west coast of Graham Land, Antarctica. Its head is fed by Temple Glacier and Kasabova Glacier.

The bay was photographed by Hunting Aerosurveys Ltd in 1955–57 and mapped from these photos by the Falkland Islands Dependencies Survey. It was named by the UK Antarctic Place-Names Committee in 1960 for Frederick W. Lanchester, an aeronautical engineer who laid the foundations of modern airfoil theory.

References

Bays of Graham Land
Davis Coast